Club Atlético Argentino, commonly known as Argentino de Rosario, is an Argentine football club from the city of Rosario, Santa Fe. The team currently plays in Primera D Metropolitana, the regionalised fifth division of the Argentine football league system.

The club was previously known as "Club Embarcadero".

1946 was Argentino's most successful year, having reached the 2nd position in the Primera B tournament. Argentino lost its penultimate match against Tiro Federal, and could not reach the promotion to Primera División.

At the end of the 2005–06 season Argentino narrowly missed out on promotion to Primera B Metropolitana, having reached the playoff final but losing 6–0 on additional time at the hands of Excursionistas.

Argentino has never played at the top level of Argentine football.

Team 2018 - 19 
 11 of may 2019

Titles
Primera B (1): 1998–99
Primera C (1): 1983

References

External links

 

Association football clubs established in 1912
1912 establishments in Argentina
Football clubs in Rosario, Santa Fe